Hadeln is a former Samtgemeinde ("collective municipality") in the district of Cuxhaven, in Lower Saxony, Germany. It was situated in the Land of Hadeln near the mouth of the river Elbe, approximately 15 km east of Cuxhaven. Its seat was in the town Otterndorf. On 1 January 2011 it merged with the Samtgemeinde Sietland to form the new Samtgemeinde Land Hadeln. 

The Samtgemeinde Hadeln consisted of the following municipalities:

 Neuenkirchen 
 Nordleda 
 Osterbruch 
 Otterndorf

External links 
 Land Hadeln : Where the Saxons began their journey : A guide to history and travel (Lowlands-L Travels)

References

Cuxhaven (district)
Former Samtgemeinden in Lower Saxony